Johannisbach may refer to:

 Johannisbach (Aachen), a river of North Rhine-Westphalia, Germany
 Johannisbach, name of the upper part of the Westfälische Aa, a river of North Rhine-Westphalia, Germany